The 1995 USC Trojans baseball team represented the University of Southern California in the 1995 NCAA Division I baseball season. The Trojans played their home games at Dedeaux Field. The team was coached by Mike Gillespie in his 9th season at USC.

The Trojans won the Pac-10 Conference and the West Regional before losing in the College World Series, defeated by the Cal State Fullerton Titans in the championship game.

Roster

Schedule and results

Schedule Source:

Awards and honors 
Geoff Jenkins
Pac-12 Conference Baseball Player of the Year
All Tournament Team
Baseball America 1st Team All-American
Collegiate Baseball 1st Team All-American
NCBWA 1st Team All-American
American Baseball Coaches Association 2nd Team All-American
1st Team All-Pacific-10 Conference

Wes Rachels
All Tournament Team

Randy Flores
Pac-12 Conference Baseball Pitcher of the Year
All Tournament Team
Collegiate Baseball 3rd Team All-American
1st Team All-Pacific-10 Conference

Gabe Alvaraz
ABCA 1st Team All-American
NCBWA 1st Team All-American
Collegiate Baseball 2nd Team All-American
Baseball America 3rd Team All-American
1st Team All-Pacific-10 Conference

Walter Dawkins
NCBWA 2nd Team All-American
1st Team All-Pacific-10 Conference

Jason Garner
Collegiate Baseball 2nd Team All-American
American Baseball Coaches Association 3rd Team All-American
1st Team All-Pacific-10 Conference

Jacque Jones
NCBWA 3rd Team All-American
1st Team All-Pacific-10 Conference

References

Pac-12 Conference baseball champion seasons
USC
USC Trojans baseball seasons
USC Trojans baseball
College World Series seasons
Southern California